New York Polyphony is a male classical vocal quartet based in New York City.

Music of the Renaissance and Medieval music periods constitutes the core of the ensemble’s repertoire, but increasingly, new music occupies an important place both in performance and on recording. Since their founding in 2006, New York Polyphony has demonstrated a commitment to contemporary music and—in the case of commissions by Andrew Smith, Gabriel Jackson, Jackson Hill and others—works by living composers. In addition, the ensemble frequently collaborates with musicians working in different mediums such as experimental performer/ composer Bora Yoon and violinist Lizzie Ball. Recent events include the European premiere of the Missa Charles Darwin—a newly commissioned secular Mass setting based on texts of Charles Darwin by composer Gregory W. Brown—at the Museum für Naturkunde in Berlin, and participation in Jonathan Berger’s chamber opera cycle Visitations at the Prototype Festival with soprano Mellissa Hughes and JACK Quartet.

New York Polyphony tours extensively throughout the United States and Europe. They have participated in major international festivals and concert series, including the Miller Theatre Music Series at Columbia University; Rheingau Musik Festival, Thüringer Bachwochen (Germany); Festival Oude Muziek Utrecht (Netherlands); Stiftskonzerte Oberösterreich (Austria); Festival de Música de Morelia (Mexico); Elora Festival (Canada); and Choral at Cadogan Hall in London.

Since 2011, New York Polyphony has recorded for BIS Records. Their 2014 effort Sing thee Nowell scored the ensemble a second GRAMMY nomination, following the critically acclaimed release Times go by Turns (2013).

Prior to signing with BIS Records, New York Polyphony released two albums on the British label Avie Records: I sing the birth (2007) and Tudor City (2010). Both received substantial critical acclaim, with the latter reaching #6 on the Billboard classical chart in June 2010.

In 2011, a Gregorian chant remix competition sponsored by Indaba Music resulted in the digital album Devices and Desires.

New York Polyphony made their television debut in December 2011 on The Martha Stewart Show.

The group comprises countertenor Geoffrey Williams, tenor Steven Caldicott Wilson, tenor Andrew Fuchs, and bass Craig Phillips.

Discography
I Sing the Birth (2007)
Tudor City (2010)
Surrexit Christus - EP (2010)
Devices & Desires (2011)
endBeginning (2012)
Times go by Turns (2013) - 56th GRAMMY nominee - Best Chamber Music/ Small Ensemble Performance
Sing thee Nowell (2014) - 57th GRAMMY nominee - Best Chamber Music/ Small Ensemble Performance
Roma Aeterna (2016)
Missa Charles Darwin (2017)
Lamentationes (2019)

References

External links
 Official website
 Opus 3 Artists
 BIS Records
 Avie Records
 Composer Andrew Smith

Vocal quartets
Early music choirs
Early music groups
A cappella musical groups
Musical groups established in 2006